Animal Planet Zooventure is an American children's television game show which originally broadcast on Animal Planet and Discovery Channel from March 31, 1997 to 2000. The show was taped in the San Diego Zoo, and was hosted by J. D. Roth. In the show, four child contestants competed in a series of animal-themed stunts for the grand prize, which is to be a zookeeper for a day.

References

External links
 Animal Planet Zooventure at the Internet Movie Database

Animal Planet original programming
1997 American television series debuts
2000 American television series endings
1990s American children's game shows
2000s American children's game shows
Discovery Channel original programming
American children's education television series
English-language television shows
Television series about children